The second Argentine general election of 1973 was held on 23 September.

Background
The jubilation that followed the May 25, 1973, return to democracy (following over six and a half years of military rule) was soon clouded by political friction and unforeseen events.  President Héctor Cámpora, who took his Oath of Office in the presence of Cuban President Osvaldo Dorticós and Chilean leader Salvador Allende—both consular figures in Latin American Marxism—promptly declared a near-blanket amnesty for the several hundred political prisoners held by Alejandro Lanusse's regime (many in inhospitable camps such as the one in Trelew, scene of a 1972 mass execution).  Cámpora also made controversial appointments, such as Rodolfo Puiggrós as President of the University of Buenos Aires, Esteban Righi as Minister of the Interior (overseeing law enforcement) and Julio Troxler as Assistant Police Chief of Buenos Aires - all former defense attorneys linked to the violently left-wing Montoneros. A number of left-wing lawyers were also elected to prominent elected posts across the nation, notably Oscar Bidegain (Governor of Buenos Aires Province), Ricardo Obregon Cano (Governor of Córdoba Province) and Alberto Martínez Baca (Governor of Mendoza Province), among others. This new-found prominence among the Argentine left encouraged an increasingly violent reaction among the far right.  Among Cámpora's appointees was one insisted on by his patron, Juan Perón: José López Rega, a former policeman with an interest in the occult close to the Perón household since 1965.

López Rega, formally Minister of Social Policy, quickly parlayed his portfolio control over nearly 30 percent of the national budget into a well-funded paramilitary force, the Argentine Anticommunist Alliance (Triple A). Threatened by the Montoneros' inroads into student and neighborhood organizations, local governments and the Peronist Youth, they began targeting many of Cámpora's policy makers, some of which began resigning under pressure from Perón, himself.  President Cámpora agreed to have Peronist militants in charge of most security arrangements for Perón's much-anticipated June 20, 1973, return from exile; as the Alitalia flight carrying the leader's retinue descended over Ministro Pistarini International Airport at Ezeiza, however, a scuffle erupted between left and right-wing minders over control of the stage from which Perón would address the nation, leading to a rash of pitched battles resulting in perhaps over a hundred deaths and Perón's public, July 13 suggestion that Cámpora resign.

The calculating López Rega seized on this to prevail on Vice President Vicente Solano Lima and Senate President Alejandro Díaz Bialet to resign, as well, leaving a constitutional vacuum referred to as an "acephaly" — the absence of a head of state.  This move created both the need for new elections and the chance to remove a number of Cámpora's leftist advisers; it also left the nation's highest office to the President of the Argentine Chamber of Deputies (lower house), Raúl Lastiri, who was, despite being a year older than López Rega, the powerful Social Policy Minister's son-in-law.  The cautious Lastiri continued Cámpora's populist socio-economic policies; inheriting a growing threat from an increasingly armed Peronist Youth and the newly-active Trotskyite People's Revolutionary Army (ERP), which, in only three months, attacked a military installation and murdered a number of military figures, he replaced Interior Minister Righi and called elections for September 23. The runners-up in the March elections — Ricardo Balbín (UCR) and Francisco Manrique (APF) — again accepted their respective party's nomination, with Manrique obtaining the endorsement of the PDP and naming its leader as his running mate.

Increasing violence led many in Argentina, including much of the armed forces to conclude that only Perón commanded enough respect to persuade extremists away from hostilities.  Gathering in Buenos Aires' renowned Teatro Colón, the Justicialist Party struggled to nominate Perón's running mate. The choice of the leader's own wife, Isabel, intrigued the convention — she was, after all, the only prominent Peronist (aside from Perón himself) not publicly associated with any one faction within the fractious movement. Opposed to López Rega's suggestion at first, the aging Perón (who would, in theory, serve until May 1977) set aside strong personal doubts as to his wife's readiness for office and agreed. The two sailed into office in a record landslide on the same FREJULI umbrella ticket on which Cámpora was elected only six months earlier.

Candidates 
 Justicialist Liberation Front (populist): Former President Juan Perón of Buenos Aires Province
 Radical Civic Union (centrist): Former Deputy Ricardo Balbín of Buenos Aires Province
 Federalist Popular Alliance (conservative): Former Minister of Social Policy Francisco Manrique of Mendoza Province
 Worker's Socialist Party: Juan Carlos Coral

Results

References

1973 in Argentina
Argentina
Elections in Argentina
1973-09